3C-E is a psychedelic of the amphetamine class. It was first synthesized by Alexander Shulgin. In his book PiHKAL, Shulgin lists the dosage range as 30 to 60 mg, consumed orally. The duration of action was stated to be 8–12 hours.

This compound is the amphetamine analog of escaline.

See also
 3C-P
 2,5-Dimethoxy-4-ethoxyamphetamine (MEM)
 Proscaline
 Mescaline

References

Designer drugs
Substituted amphetamines
Mescalines
O-methylated phenols